Frank D'Arcy is a footballer who played as a defender in the Football League for Everton and Tranmere Rovers. He was part of the Everton side that won the First Division in the 1969–70 season; making 5 appearances in the process.

References

1946 births
Living people
Footballers from Liverpool
Association football defenders
English footballers
Everton F.C. players
Tranmere Rovers F.C. players
English Football League players
Knowsley United F.C. players